Plac Grunwaldzki (Grunwaldzki Square) is a housing estate in Wrocław, located in the area of the former Downtown District. The name of the estate comes from the centrally located Grunwaldzki Square.

The estate includes the area delimited by Wyszyńskiego Street in the west, Sienkiewicza and Grunwaldzka Streets in the north, as well as the Oder: the Old Oder River in the east and the main riverbed in the south. The German name of the central intersection (Scheitniger Stern – Szczytnicka Star) and modern names of Szczytnicki Bridge and Szczytnicka Street are connected with the medieval village Szczytniki, located behind the bridge; Szczytnicki Park is located there now. The estate also includes the area of the former Fischerau village (sometimes translated to Polish as Rybaki), located near the intersection of Grunwaldzka and Piastowska Streets.

Plac Grunwaldzki is adjacent to Stare Miasto, Olbin, Zacisze-Zalesie-Szczytniki, Biskupin-Sępolno-Dąbie-Bartoszowice and Przedmieście Oławskie.

References

Districts of Wrocław
Student quarters